Kenneth Brooks Reid, Jr. is a graph theorist and the founder faculty (Head 1989) professor at California State University, San Marcos (CSUSM). He specializes in combinatorial mathematics. He is known for his work in tournaments, frequency partitions and aspects of voting theory. He is known (with E. T. Parker) on a disproof of a conjecture on tournaments by Erdős and Moser.

He received his Ph.D. on a dissertation called "Structure in Finite Graphs" from the University of Illinois at Urbana-Champaign in 1968, his advisor was E. T. Parker. Reid is a professor emeritus at Louisiana State University (1968–1989) and has guided students for their Ph.D.s at Baton Rouge.

He is a professor emeritus at CSUSM.

Selected work

 [Book] Disproof of a conjecture of Erdos and Moser on tournaments, KB Reid, ET Parker, ILLINOIS UNIV URBANA - 1964 - oai.dtic.mil
 Domination graphs of tournaments and digraphs, DC Fisher, JR Lundgren, SK Merz, KB Reid - Congressus Numerantium, 1995 - citeseerx.ist.psu.edu
 Tournaments, K.B. Reid, L. W. Beineke - Selected topics in graph theory, 1978

References

 Reid's page at CSUSM
 

Graph theorists
Year of birth missing (living people)
Living people
University of Illinois Urbana-Champaign alumni
California State University San Marcos faculty
San Marcos